The Ambassador of the Kingdom of Yugoslavia to the Kingdom of Romania was the Kingdom of Yugoslavia's foremost diplomatic representative to the Kingdom of Romania. The ambassador was the head of the Kingdom of Yugoslavia's diplomatic mission. The position existed in the years between the creation of the Kingdom of Serbs, Croats, and Slovene in 1918 and the creation of the Socialist Federal Republic of Yugoslavia in 1946.

List of heads of mission

Envoy Extraordinary and Minister Plenipotentiary to the Kingdom of Romania

References

Lists of ambassadors of the Kingdom of Yugoslavia
Yugoslavia